Malaysia Prison Museum is a prison museum that displays items and information about prison life in Malacca City, Malacca, Malaysia. It was officially opened by Yang di-Pertua Negeri of Malacca Mohd Khalil Yaakob on 20 November 2014. The museum's building was originally constructed in 1860 by Governor Colonel Cavenagh as HM Prison Jail, and was also known as Henry Gurney School 2nd Bandar Hilir since 1964 and Bandar Hilir Prison since 11 June 1990.

See also
 List of museums in Malaysia
 List of tourist attractions in Malacca
 List of jail and prison museums

References

2014 establishments in Malaysia
Buildings and structures in Malacca City
Museums in Malacca
Museums established in 2014
Prison museums in Asia